Shadow Theater is the fifth album by Tigran Hamasyan published in 2013. The album contains 12 tracks and is a mix of several different styles, including jazz, jazz fusion, pop and Armenian folk. The album consists of tracks which he had composed many years ago, but not released. He then adapted and changed these tracks over around six years, until the album's release in 2013. This was Tigran's second release on Verve and was released in the US on Sunnyside the following year.

Track listing

References 

2013 albums
Verve Records albums
Tigran Hamasyan albums
Sunnyside Records albums